Annobón is a small province of Equatorial Guinea.

Annobón may also refer to:

 Annobonese language
 Annobon people